Wheelchair basketball at the 1984 Summer Paralympics consisted of men's and women's team events.

Medal summary 

Source: Paralympic.org

See also
Basketball at the 1984 Summer Olympics

References 

 

Wheelchair basketball
1984
1984 in basketball
1984–85 in American basketball
International basketball competitions hosted by the United States